Raúl Andrés Osorio Medina (born 29 June 1995) is a Chilean professional footballer who plays for the Primera División club O'Higgins as a defender.

Career

Youth career
Osorio started his career at Primera División de Chile club O'Higgins. He progressed from the under categories club all the way to the senior team.

O'Higgins
Osorio won the Apertura 2013-14 with O'Higgins, in the 2013–14 Súper Final Apertura against Universidad Católica, being the first title for O'Higgins.

In 2014, he won the Supercopa de Chile against Deportes Iquique, in the match that O'Higgins won at the penalty shoot-out.

He participated with the club in the 2014 Copa Libertadores where they faced Deportivo Cali, Cerro Porteño and Lanús, being third and being eliminated in the group stage.

International career
He was part of the Chile U20 squad that played the 2015 South American Youth Championship in Uruguay. On the previous year, he was in the Chile squad for the 2014 Toulon Tournament which included U21 players.

Honours

Club
O'Higgins
 Primera División: 2013–A
 Supercopa de Chile: 2014

Individual
O'Higgins
Medalla Santa Cruz de Triana: 2014

References

External links
 Osorio at Football Lineups
 

1995 births
Living people
Association football defenders
Chilean footballers
Chile youth international footballers
O'Higgins F.C. footballers
Coquimbo Unido footballers
Chilean Primera División players
2015 South American Youth Football Championship players